Xiazhuang may refer to the following locations in China:

 Xiazhuang Township (下庄乡), Fuping County, Hebei
Written as "夏庄镇":
 Xiazhuang, Gucheng County, Hebei, town
 Xiazhuang, Xi County, Henan, town in Xi County, Henan
 Xiazhuang, Gaomi, town in Gaomi, Shandong
 Xiazhuang, Ju County, town in Ju County, Shandong
 Xiazhuang, Rongcheng, Shandong, town in Rongcheng, Shandong